Amerika Perdida is a compilation album by Mano Negra, released on 28 October 1991.

Track listing 
All tracks composed by Manu Chao; except where indicated
 "Mano Negra" – 1:44 [Patchanka]
 "Mala Vida" – 2:53 [Patchanka]
 "Amerika Perdida" (Manu Chao, Mano Negra) – 2:58
 "Peligro" (Traditional arranged by Mano Negra) – 2:52 [Puta's Fever]
 "Sidi H' Bibi" (Traditional arranged by Mano Negra) – 2:36 [Puta's Fever]
 "Noche de Accion" – 2:46 [Patchanka]
 "El Sur" – 1:00 [Puta's Fever]
 "Patchuko Hop" (Joe "King" Carrasco) – 2:28 [Puta's Fever]
 "Mano Negra" – 0:57 [Puta's Fever]
 "Patchanka" (Manu Chao, Mano Negra) – 3:05 [Puta's Fever]
 "Indios De Barcelona" – 2:34 [Patchanka]
 "Guayaquil City" (Mano Negra, Thomas Darnal) – 3:01 [Puta's Fever]
 "El Jako" (Manu Chao, Mano Negra) – 2:48 [King of Bongo]
 "Soledad" – 2:34 [Puta's Fever]
 "King Kong Five" (Manu Chao, Mano Negra) – 1:56 [Puta's Fever]
 "Salga La Luna" – 3:34 [Patchanka]

Personnel 
 Manu Chao – Lead Vocals & Guitar (All Tracks)
 Antoine Chao – Trumpet & Vocals (All Tracks)
 Santiago Casariego – Drums & Vocals (All Tracks)
 Philippe Teboul – Percussion & Vocals (Tracks 4–5, 7–10, 12–15)
 Daniel Jamet – Lead Guitar & Vocals (Tracks 4–5, 7–10, 12–15)
 Joseph Dahan – Bass & Vocals (Tracks 4–5, 7–10, 12, 13–15)
 Thomas Darnal – Keyboards & Vocals (Tracks 4–5, 7–10, 12–15)
 Pierre Gauthé – Trombone & Vocals (Tracks 4–5, 7–10, 12, 14–15)

Guest musicians 
 Anouk – Vocals (All Tracks)
 Jean-Marc – Bass (Tracks 1, 2, 6, 11, 16)
 Mamack Vachter – Saxophone & Vocals (Tracks 1, 2, 6, 11, 16)
 Dirty District (Denis, Gilles, Fred, Geo) – Vocals, Guitar, Bass, Synthesizer (Tracks 1, 2, 6, 11, 16)
 Les Casse-Pieds (Lolo, Daniel, Phillippe, Jo, Tomas) – Vocals, Guitar, Bass, Drums (Tracks 1, 2, 6, 11, 16)
 Alain Wampas – Double Bass & Vocals (Tracks 1–2, 4–12, 14–16)
 Napo Romero – Vocals (Tracks 4–5, 7–10, 12, 14–15)
 Zofia – Vocals (Tracks 4–5, 7–10, 12, 14–15)

References 

Mano Negra (band) albums
1991 compilation albums